Cussac may refer to:
 Cussac, Cantal, a French commune in the department of Cantal
 Cussac, Haute-Vienne, a French commune in the department of Haute-Vienne
 Cussac-Fort-Médoc, a French commune in the department of Gironde
 Cussac-sur-Loire, a French commune in the department of Haute-Loire
 Grotte de Cussac, a cave containing paleolithic art in Le Buisson-de-Cadouin, Dordogne, Aquitaine, France

See also
Cusack, a variant of the surname 'de Cussac'
Cusack (surname)